In music, Op. 28 stands for Opus number 28. Compositions that are assigned this number include:

 Beethoven – Piano Sonata No. 15
 Britten – A Ceremony of Carols
 Chopin – Preludes, Op. 28
 Danzi – Horn Sonata No. 1
 Elgar – Organ Sonata
 Enescu – Impressions d'enfance
 Ginastera – Piano Concerto No. 1
 Holbrooke – Horn Trio
 Holst – First Suite in E-flat for Military Band
 Korngold – Die Kathrin
 Myaskovsky – Symphony No. 9
 Prokofiev – Piano Sonata No. 3
 Rachmaninoff – Piano Sonata No. 1
 Ries – Piano Trio, Op. 28
 Saint-Saëns – Introduction and Rondo Capriccioso
 Schmitt – Reflets d'Allemagne
 Schumann – Three Romances for piano
 Scriabin – Fantaisie in B minor
 Strauss – Till Eulenspiegel's Merry Pranks
 Szymanowski – Nocturne and Tarantella
 Vierne – Organ Symphony No. 3
 Waterhouse – Three Pieces for Solo Cello
 Webern – String Quartet